Keshav Baliram Hedgewar (1 April 1889 – 21 June 1940), also known by his moniker Doctorji, was an Indian physician and  the founding Sarsanghachalak (or "Chief") of the Rashtriya Swayamsevak Sangh (RSS). Hedgewar founded the RSS in Nagpur in 1925, based on the ideology of Hindutva with the intention of creating a Hindu Rashtra.

Early life 
Hedgewar was born on 1 April 1889 in a Telugu-speaking Deshastha Rigvedi Brahmin (DRB) family in Nagpur.  His parents were Baliram Pant Hedgewar and Revatibai, a couple of modest means. When Hedgewar was thirteen both of his parents died in the epidemic of plague of 1902. Hedgewar's uncle ensured that he continued to receive a good education, and B. S. Moonje became a patron and a father-figure for the young Hedgewar.

He studied at Neel City High School in Nagpur, from where he was expelled singing "Vande Mataram" in violation of the circular issued by the then British colonial government. As a result, he had to pursue his high school studies at the Rashtriya Vidyalaya in Yavatmal and later in Pune. After matriculating, he was sent to Kolkata by B. S. Moonje (a member of the Congress, who later became the President of the Hindu Mahasabha) in 1910 to pursue his medical studies. After passing the L.M.S. Examination from the Calcutta Medical College  in June 1916, he completed a yearlong apprenticeship and returned to Nagpur in 1917 as a physician.

Ideological roots 
After completing his education, Hedgewar joined the Anushilan Samiti  in Bengal, which was influenced deeply by the writings of Bankim Chandra Chatterjee. Hedgewar's initiation into this group, rooted in Hindu symbolism, was an important step in his path towards creating the RSS. Hedgewar was also deeply influenced by   Vinayak Damodar Savarkar treatise Hindutva. Dr. Hedgewar was also highly influenced by Samarth Ramdas's Dasbodh and Lokamanya Tilak's Geeta Rahasya. His letters often bore quotes from Tukaram.

Formation of RSS 

Hedgewar participated in the Indian National Congress in the 1920s, but he became disillusioned with their policies and politics. He had been an active member of the party's volunteer division - Hindustani Seva Dal, the predecessor of the Congress Seva Dal. He was deeply influenced by the writings of Lokmanya Bal Gangadhar Tilak, Vinayak Damodar Savarkar, Babarao Savarkar, Arvind Ghosh and B. S. Moonje. He also read Mazzini and other enlightenment philosophers. He considered that the cultural and religious heritage of Hindus should be the basis of Indian nationhood.  

Hedgewar founded RSS in 1925 on the day of Vijayadashami with an aim to organise Hindu community for its cultural and spiritual regeneration and make it a tool for achieving complete independence for a united India. Hedgewar suggested the term 'Rashtriya' (national) for his Hindu organization, for he wanted to re-assert the Hindu identity with 'Rashtriya'. Hedgewar supported the setting up of a women's wing of the organization in 1936 called Rashtra Sevika Samiti.

Those that participated in the movement were called Swayamsevaks (meaning self servants). Early Swayamsevaks included Bhaiyaji Dani, Babasaheb Apte, M. S. Golwalkar, Balasaheb Deoras, and Madhukar Rao Bhagwat, among others. The Sangh (Community) was growing in Nagpur and the surrounding districts, and it soon began to spread to other provinces. Hedgewar went to a number of places and inspired the youths for taking up Sangh work. Gradually all his associates had begun to endearingly call him 'Doctor ji.'

Political activities post formation of RSS 

After founding the Rashtriya Swayamsevak Sangh in 1925, Hedgewar maintained a healthy distance from Indian Independence movement as led by Gandhi. Instead he encouraged local Swayamsevaks to participate on their own accord with the struggle. This lack of enthusiasm in the Independence Movement is heavily criticised by Anti-RSS groups. According to some sources, Hedgewar was actively discouraging RSS cadres to not join the movement which was led by Gandhi. The RSS biographer C. P. Bhishikar states, "after establishing Sangh, Doctor Saheb in his speeches used to talk only of Hindu organization". Direct comment on (British) Government used to be almost nil." 

When the Congress passed the Purna Swaraj resolution in its Lahore session in December 1929, and called upon all Indians to celebrate 26 January 1930 as Independence Day, Hedgewar issued a circular asking all the RSS shakhas to observe the occasion through hoisting and worship of the Bhagwa Dhwaj (saffron flag), rather than the Tricolor (which was, by consensus, considered the flag of the Indian national movement at that time). 

1930 was the only year when the RSS celebrated 26 January and it stopped the practice from the next year onwards. However, such celebration became a standard feature of the freedom movement and often came to mean violent confrontation with the official police. C. P. Bhishikar states,[In April 1930], Mahatma Gandhi gave a call for 'Satyagraha' against the British Government. Gandhi himself launched the Salt Satyagraha undertaking his Dandi Yatra. Dr. Hedgewar decided to participate only individually and not let the RSS join the freedom movement officially. He sent information everywhere that the Sangh will not participate in the Satyagraha. However those wishing to participate individually in it were not prohibited.

Hedgewar emphasized that he participated in the Civil Disobedience movement of 1930 in an individual capacity, and not as a RSS member. His concern was to keep the RSS out of the political arena. According to Hedgewar's biography, when Gandhi launched the Salt Satyagraha in 1930, he sent information everywhere that the RSS will not participate in the Satyagraha. However those wishing to participate individually in it were not prohibited. 

For Hedgewar, India was an ancient civilisation, and the freedom struggle was an attempt to re-establish a land for the Hindus after almost 800 years of foreign rule, primarily by the Mugals and then by the British. The tri-colour according to Hedgewar did not encaptulate the ancient past of India. Hedgewar insisted that the RSS must only be involved with "man-making". He was critical of Hindu society and its degeneration over the centuries with its out-dated and often backward practices. The RSS, he wrote, must be completely devoted to establishing men of character and worthy of respect the world over.

Establishment of Rashtra Sevika Samiti
Laxmibai Kelkar was the founder of the Rashtra Sevika Samiti. Before establishing the organization, Kelkar visited Dr. K.B. Hedgewar, the founder of the RSS, in 1936 and had a long discussion to persuade him regarding the need for starting a women's wing in the Rashtriya Swayamsevak Sangh itself. Hedgewar, though, continued to restrict membership of the RSS to men. However, Hedgewar advised Laxmibai Kelkar to establish an entirely separate organization that would be autonomous and independent of the RSS, as both groups were ideologically identical. Hedgewar promised Kelkar unconditional solidarity, support and guidance for the Samithi. Following this, Kelkar established the Rashtra Sevika Samiti at Wardha on 25 October 1936.

Death and legacy 

His health deteriorated in later years of his life. Often he suffered from chronic back pain. He started delegating his responsibilities to M. S. Golwalkar, who later succeeded him as Sarsanghachalak of RSS. In January 1940, he was taken to Rajgir in Bihar for the hot-spring treatment.

He attended the annual Sangh Shiksha Varg (officer training camp) in 1940, where he gave his last message to Swayamsevaks, saying: 'I see before my eyes today a miniature Hindu Rashtra." He died on the morning of 21 June 1940 in Nagpur. His last rites were performed in the locality of Resham Bagh in Nagpur, which was later developed as Hedgewar Smruti Mandir.

Former PM Atal Bihari Vajpayee described Hegdewar as a great patriot, freedom fighter and nationalist during his commemoration on a postal stamp in 1999. Hedgewar was described as "a great son of Mother India" by former President of India Pranab Mukherjee during his visit to Hedgewar's birthplace in Nagpur.

Establishments named after Hedgewar 
Shree Keshav Co operative Credit Society Ltd. Junagadh, Gujarat.
Dr. Hedgewar Institute Of Medical Sciences & Research (Dhimsr) Amravati
Dr. Hedgewar Shikshan Pratishthan Ahmednagar
Dr. K. B. Hedgewar High School Goa
Dr. Hedgewar Aarogya Sansthan, Karkardooma, New Delhi.
Hedgewar Hospital, Aurangabad.
Hedgewar Ayurvedic BAMS college, Chikhli Maharashtra.
Dr Keshav Baliram Hedgewar chair, Himachal Pradesh University, Shimla, Himachal Pradesh.
Keshav Srushti, Bhayander (W), Thane, Maharashtra

References

Further reading 
 
 
 Rakesh Sinha's Dr. Keshav Baliram Hedgewar (in Telugu) by Vaddi Vijayasaradhi. .

External links 

 Remembering Doctorji - samvada.org 

Sarsanghchalaks
Activists from Maharashtra
1889 births
1940 deaths
People from Nagpur
Anushilan Samiti
Marathi people